My Creed may refer to:

 "An American's Creed" (also "My Creed"), a short statement by American politician Dean Alfange
 "My Creed", a poem by American Congregationalist minister, author, and hymnwriter Howard Walter